Babarobot (meaning fembot), is a concept album by the Russian ska punk band, Leningrad, presented as a playful radio drama. The first track includes the other twelve songs of the album (Gelendzhik is repeated) with dialogue between.

Story
Graduates from the Technical Training College are sent to a factory. The factory worker, Vladimir, tells them about the factory. Further along, they meet an old school friend, Borya. He tells them about their new invention, Babarobots, which are robot women.

Track listing
"Бабаробот" - 30:16
"Караоке" - Karaoke – 1:54
"Наш завод" - Nash zavod - (Our Factory) – 1:49
"Мы идём" - My idyom - (We walk) – 1:44 
"Бабаробот" - Babarobot - (Fembot) – 1:53
"Теперь я бабаробот" - Teper ya babarobot - (Now I'm a Fembot) – 1:34
"Мачи" - Machi - (Machos) – 3:03
"Всё хорошо" - Vsyo khorosho - (Everything is Good) – 2:38 
"Кому легко" - Komu legko - (Whom Is It Easy For?) – 2:29 
"Роботы ебоботы" - Roboty yeboboty - (Robots Fucking Robots) – 2:27 
"Ария робота" - Ariya robota - (Aria of a Robot) – 1:50  	
"Геленджик" - Gelendzhik (a city in southern Russia) - 3:10  	
"Алые паруса" - Alye parusa - (Scarlet Sails) – 2:11

References
http://www.gif.ru/texts/babarobot/city_876/fah_941/
http://www.shnur.de/pressa/381.htm
http://www.rol.ru/news/art/music/04/06/05_001.htm
https://web.archive.org/web/20070815164546/http://sqd.ru/music/rock/babarobot_ili_kak_nuzhno_delat_saundtreki

2004 albums
Concept albums
Leningrad (band) albums